Don't Back Down may refer to:

 "Don't Back Down" (song), a song by The Beach Boys
 Don't Back Down (album), an album by The Queers